'Alqama ibn 'Ubada,, generally known as  'Alqama al-Fahl, was an Arabian poet of the tribe Tamim, who flourished in the second half of the 6th century.

The name al-Fahl literally means "the stallion" which he became known by when won a poetic contest against Imru' al-Qais, in addition Imru wife thought that he completely surpassed Imru in that contest, then Imru divorced her and 'Alqama married her. What happened became so popular in the peninsula and people started to call him by that title. His poetic description of ostriches is said to have been famous among the Arabs. His diwan consists of three qasidas (elegies) and eleven fragments. Asma'i considered three of the poems genuine.

The poems were edited by Albert Socin with Latin translation as Die Gedichte des 'Alkama Alfahl (Leipzig, 1867), and are contained in Wilhelm Ahlwardt's The Diwans of the six ancient Arabic Poets (London, 1870); cf. Ahlwardt's Bemerkungen über die Echtheit der alten arabischen Gedichte (Greifswald, 1872), pp. 65–71 and 146–168.

References 

6th-century Arabic poets
Year of birth unknown
Year of death unknown